Felix Luchsinger (born c. 1959) is a former Swiss curler.

At the time of the 1987 World Championship, he was employed as a life insurance salesman.

Teams

References

External links
 

Swiss male curlers
European curling champions
Swiss curling champions